Authentic instrument may refer to:

 Historically informed performance
 Public instrument